Otello Subinaghi (born April 2, 1910 in Lodi) was an Italian professional football player.

He played for 8 seasons (119 games, 34 games) in the Serie A for U.S. Cremonese, Modena F.C. and A.S. Roma.

1910 births
Year of death missing
Italian footballers
Serie A players
U.S. Cremonese players
Modena F.C. players
Cagliari Calcio players
A.S. Roma players
People from Lodi, Lombardy
Footballers from Lombardy
Association football midfielders
S.G. Gallaratese A.S.D. players
A.S.D. Fanfulla players
Sportspeople from the Province of Lodi